The Amazing Race Canada 5 is the fifth season of The Amazing Race Canada, a reality game show based on the American series The Amazing Race. It features ten teams of two, each with a pre-existing relationship in a race across Canada and across the world and is hosted by Jon Montgomery. The grand prize includes a  cash payout, a "once-in-a-lifetime" trip for two around the world with accommodation in Asia provided by new sponsor Sinorama, and two 2018 Chevrolet Equinox "True North Edition" SUVs.

The season premiered on July 4, 2017, with the season finale airing on September 12, 2017.

Dating couple Sam Lambert and Paul Mitskopoulos were the winners of this season.

Production

Development and filming

On October 12, 2016, CTV announced that the show was renewed for the fifth season.

This season featured the addition of several real-time interactive features during the airing of each episode, including trivia, polls, and a national leaderboard. Additionally, viewers were able to explore locations seen throughout the race through virtual 360 degree views, including this season's Starting Line: Signal Hill National Historic Site in St. John's, Newfoundland and Labrador.

Included among the 360-degree view videos on CTV's official YouTube page was of a game of underwater hockey being played in the swimming pool at the Centre Sportif de Gatineau in Gatineau, Quebec. This is the only 360-degree location to never be seen nor mentioned on air, so it is unknown whether this was originally intended to be a task during Leg 6's visit to Gatineau, or was simply unaired.

To mark the occasion of 2017 being the 150th anniversary of the Confederation of Canada, some legs featured a specially-themed task called a 150 Challenge.

According to executive producer John Brunton, an overseas visit to Kenya was originally planned, but was scrapped due to safety concerns.

Casting
Casting began on October 12, 2016, and as in the previous four seasons, an online site was used for submission of applications and audition videos. Casting closed on December 1, 2016.

Programming
Similar to previous seasons, a special season-end reunion/recap again titled "After The Race", again hosted by the cast of The Social, aired immediately after the season finale with all teams present – minus Ebonie who was unable to attend – to review the season as a whole.

Marketing
Trip sponsor Hotels.com, outerwear sponsor Mountain Equipment Co-op, and Mentos discontinued their sponsorship; Chevrolet continued sponsoring the show along with multiple previous seasons' sponsor, Bank of Montreal (BMO). New sponsors for this season are trip sponsor Sinorama Holidays, Canadian Tire's Woods brand as outerwear/outfitter sponsor, and the Campbell Soup Company.

As additional marketing for sponsor Chevrolet, following each episode, a special series by previous season winners Steph LeClair and Kristen McKenzie entitled Backseat Drivers (a reference to the Roadblock clue in leg 6 of their season) was featured in the bonus videos. In these roughly two-and-a-half-minute clips, Steph & Kristen discussed the events of the previous episode while driving a differing Chevrolet vehicle, sometimes then stopping to pick up a team from a previous season and discuss what's changed in their lives since their respective season. The feature teams included: Hal & Joanne and Holly & Brett from Season 1, Rex & Bob from Season 2, Brent & Sean and Hamilton & Michaelia from Season 3, Frankie & Amy from Season 4, and this year's winners Sam & Paul for the finale installment.

Cast
The cast includes former Canada's Next Top Model cycle 3 contestant Ebonie Finley-Roberge, who placed 8th.

Contestant Kenneth McAlpine died in a hiking accident on Mount Gimli in the West Kootenay region of British Columbia on August 26, 2019, at the age of 28. The Season 7 finale included a picture of McAlpine and a brief memorial message.

Future appearances 
Sam & Paul were the local Pit Stop greeters of during the sixth leg of Season 6 at Ireland Park in their hometown of Toronto.

On February 5, 2020, Karen & Bert competed with their family on an episode of Family Feud Canada but failed to reach Fast Money. On November 30, 2020, Sam competed on the same show with his family.

Results
The following teams participated in this season, each listed along with their placements in each leg and relationships as identified by the program. Note that this table is not necessarily reflective of all content broadcast on television, owing to the inclusion or exclusion of some data. Placements are listed in finishing order.

A  placement with a dagger indicates that the team was eliminated.
An  placement with a double-dagger indicates that the team was the last to arrive at a pit stop in a non-elimination leg, and had to perform a Speed Bump task in the following leg.
 An italicized and underlined placement indicates that the team was the last to arrive at a pit stop, but there was no rest period at the pit stop and all teams were instructed to continue racing. There was no required Speed Bump task in the next leg.
A  indicates that the team won the Fast Forward.
An  indicates that the team used an Express Pass on that leg to bypass one of their tasks.
A  indicates that the team used the U-Turn and a  indicates the team on the receiving end of the U-Turn.
A  indicates the leg has the Face Off, while a  indicates the team that lost the Face Off.

Notes

Prizes
The prize for each leg is awarded to the first place team for that leg.

Leg 1 – A trip for two to Barcelona, Spain
Leg 2 – A trip for two to Auckland, New Zealand
Leg 3 – A trip for two to Chicago, Illinois
Energy Efficient Driving Challenge – $5,000 from Chevrolet. Awarded to Kenneth & Ryan.
Leg 4 – A trip for two to Beijing, Xi'an, Shanghai, and the Yangtze river in China, courtesy of Sinorama
Leg 5 – A trip for two to Bangkok, Chiang Mai, and the Golden Triangle of Thailand; and Yangzhou and Shanghai, China, courtesy of Sinorama
Leg 6 – A five-city cross-Canada trip
Leg 7 – A trip for two to Rio de Janeiro, Brazil
Leg 8 – A trip for two to New Orleans, Louisiana
Leg 9 – A trip for two to Costa Rica
Leg 10 – A trip for two to Cape Town, South Africa
Leg 11 – A CA$250,000 cash payout, a "once-in-a-lifetime" trip for two around the world, and a 2018 Chevrolet Equinox "True North Edition" for each team member.

Race summary

Leg 1 (Newfoundland and Labrador → British Columbia)

Airdate:: July 4, 2017
St. John's, Newfoundland and Labrador, Canada (Signal Hill National Historic Site – Queen's Battery) (Starting Line)
St. John's (Signal Hill National Historic Site – Cabot Tower)
 St. John's (St. John's International Airport) to Vancouver, British Columbia (Vancouver International Airport)
District of North Vancouver (Capilano Suspension Bridge Park)
Vancouver (Gastown – "Gassy Jack" Deighton Statue)
  Vancouver (The Fairmont Hotel Vancouver)
 Vancouver (Sunset Beach or False Creek)
Vancouver (VanDusen Botanical Garden – Hedge Maze) 

In this season's first Roadblock and 150 Challenge, one team member had to walk across a tightrope suspended 12 storeys across the front of the hotel to retrieve the next clue.

This season's first Detour was a choice between Pedal or Paddle. In Pedal, teams travelled to Sunset Beach where, riding bicycles, they had to complete two bike polo drills. First, each team member while riding a bicycle had to maneuver the ball using a plastic mallet through a series of cones. They then had to pass the ball back and forth to each other and score one goal to receive their next clue. In Paddle, teams joined a dragon boat racing crew. One team member helped paddle, while the other steered the boat with an oar through a course in False Creek using specific commands. Once they completed the course, teams received their next clue.

Additional tasks
At Cabot Tower, teams had to listen to a morse code message transmitted from the ham radio station inside the tower and try to decipher their first destination of the season. Once teams had deciphered the correct answer, "Vancouver Capilano Bridge", they would receive their next clue, which also contained a BMO credit card that would serve as the teams' source of money for the duration of the season.
Upon arrival in Vancouver, teams had to search the grounds of Capilano Suspension Bridge Park for a falconer who would give teams their next clue, instructing them to find the "Gassy Jack" Statue in Maple Tree Square, where their Roadblock clue was located.
After finishing the Detour, teams headed to VanDusen Botanical Garden where they had to locate the hedge maze and find the Pit Stop inside.

Additional note
Teams used a provided 2017 Chevrolet Trax to drive to St. John's International Airport.

Leg 2 (British Columbia → Alberta)

Airdate: July 11, 2017
Vancouver (Seawall Water Walk) (Pit Start)
 Vancouver (Vancouver International Airport) to Fort McMurray, Alberta (Fort McMurray International Airport)
R.M. of Wood Buffalo (Vista Ridge – Wild Play Park)  
  R.M. of Wood Buffalo (Fort McMurray Fish and Game Association)
 R.M. of Wood Buffalo (Phoenix Heli-Flight) to Fort McMurray (MacDonald Island Park – SMS Stadium at Shell Place)
Fort McMurray (MacDonald Island Park – Miskanaw Golf Club 16th Hole) 

In this leg's Roadblock, one team member had to search the Wild Play adventure park for three different coloured pieces of their next clue in pouches scattered among the park's 50 platforms. Additionally, three of the pouches contained an Express Pass. A team could claim more than one Express Pass, but they had to give any extra passes away by the end of the third leg.

This leg's Detour at the Fort McMurray Fish and Game Association was a choice between Pump It or Pull It, both had a limit of 5 stations. In Pump It (the 150 Challenge of the leg), teams had to suit up as firefighters and carry a  water pump to a nearby reservoir and figure out how to correctly operate the pump. In Pull It, teams had to shoot a total of 15 clay targets with a 20-gauge shotgun, alternating partners after every 3 shots, to receive their next clue.

Additional tasks
Upon arrival in Fort McMurray, teams had to search outside the airport terminal for their 2017 Chevrolet Silverados with their clue inside. The provided vehicle would be their only means of transportation during the leg.
In the hangar at Phoenix Heli-Flight, teams had to use figures from a helicopter's previous trip to calculate the missing fuel weight fraction values needed to determine its centre of gravity. Once teams filled in the correct solution, they received their next clue.
After completing the previous task, teams were flown in a helicopter, over an area destroyed by the 2016 Fort McMurray wildfire, to touch down in SMS Stadium in MacDonald Island Park. Once there, they searched for the 16th hole at Miskanaw Golf Club, the Pit Stop for this leg.

Leg 3 (Alberta → British Columbia)

Airdate: July 18, 2017
RM of Wood Buffalo (Syncrude Giants of Mining Exhibit) (Pit Start)
 Fort McMurray (Fort McMurray International Airport) to Castlegar, British Columbia (West Kootenay Regional Airport)
Castlegar (Chances Casino) (Unaired)
Castlegar (Columbia River – Zuckerberg Island)
Nelson (Oso Negro Coffee Roastery)
 Nelson (Kootenay Lake – 'Big Orange Bridge')
 Nelson (Selkirk College School of the Arts)
Kokanee Creek Provincial Park (Kootenay Lake) 

In this leg's Roadblock, one team member had to put on a wetsuit and swing from a cord beneath the Nelson Bridge, known locally as the "Big Orange Bridge", letting go to land as close as possible to a buoy holding their clue. They then had to swim the rest of the way across Kootenay Lake to the dock where they would reunite with their partner.

Billed as the "Number One Small Town Arts Community in Canada", this leg's Detour paid tribute to Nelson's large and diverse artisan community, with a choice between Strike It or Throw It. In Strike It, teams had to use provided blacksmith tools to forge red-hot irons into two coat hooks that matched a given example to receive their next clue. In Throw It, teams had to use a potter's wheel and provided tools to correctly "throw" two ceramic cups from clay to receive their next clue. Kenneth & Ryan used their Express Pass to bypass the Detour.

Additional tasks
Upon arrival in Castlegar, teams found a 2017 Chevrolet Bolt EV outside Chances Casino that served as their transportation on this leg. Additionally, the team who drove the most efficiently using the car's regenerative braking feature would receive a $5,000 prize from Chevrolet at the Pit Stop.
At Zuckerberg Island, teams encountered a task from sponsor Woods. After inspecting an example campsite setup, teams had to locate nine other campsites in the vicinity and correctly identify the single difference from the example at each of them to receive their next clue.
At Oso Negro Coffee Roastery, teams had to make two deliveries of custom coffee blends on foot, then return to the roastery to receive the clue for the Roadblock. The locations varied for each team. Karen & Bert used the Express Pass given to them by Kenneth & Ryan to bypass the coffee delivery task.

Leg 4 (British Columbia → China)

Airdate: July 25, 2017
Nelson (Prestige Lakeside Resort) (Pit Start)
 Castlegar (West Kootenay Regional Airport) to Vancouver (Vancouver International Airport)
Richmond (Sinorama Tours Office)
 Vancouver (Vancouver International Airport) to Beijing, China (Beijing Capital International Airport)
Beijing (Great Wall of China – Jūyōng Pass)
Beijing (Canadian Embassy)
 Beijing (Ying Tung Natatorium)
Beijing (Ren Yi Tang) 
Beijing (Drum Tower Square) 

This leg's Detour was a choice between In Sync or In Line, both taking place at the Ying Tung Natatorium, one of the venues of the 2008 Summer Olympics. In In Sync, teams had to synchronized dive from the  diving platform into the pool and earn a combined score of 20 or more from the three judges to receive their next clue. In In Line, teams had to dress in colourful costumes and correctly perform a dance routine on the terrace combining a flash mob and line dancing to receive their next clue.

In this leg's Roadblock at Ren Yi Tang, a traditional pharmacy, one team member was given a herbal remedy prescription with three ingredients, written in Chinese characters, and had to search among 800 drawers for the three drawers with corresponding characters. Once all three ingredients were found, they had to weigh the correct doses to receive their next clue from the pharmacist.

Additional tasks
Upon arrival in Vancouver, teams had to travel to the local office of Sinorama Holidays to receive a travel package of their airplane tickets, a trip guidebook and plush toys of the company's panda bear mascot.
At Juyong Pass along the Great Wall of China, teams had to dress as Sinorama tour guides before memorizing and correctly reciting facts about the wall to a group of tourists in three languages – English, French, and Mandarin Chinese – to receive their next clue from a Sinorama Holidays tour guide.
At the Canadian Embassy in Beijing, teams had to interrupt a game of ball hockey to receive the Detour clue from the goalie.

Leg 5 (China → Thailand)

Airdate: August 1, 2017
 Beijing (Beijing South Railway Station) to Shanghai (Shanghai Hongqiao Railway Station)
Shanghai (Tock's Montreal Style Deli)
 Shanghai (Shanghai Pudong International Airport) to Bangkok, Thailand (Suvarnabhumi Airport)
Bangkok (Caturday Café)
 Bangkok (National Stadium)
 Bangkok (Yodpiman Riverwalk – Pier 2 to Wat Khuha Sawan Pier – Artist's House)
 Bangkok (Wat Ratchanatdaram, Amulet Market, and Khlong Thom Centre or Flow House)
Bangkok (Wat Thewarat Kunchorn Worawihan Temple) 

Teams who chose to attempt the Fast Forward had to travel to the grounds of the National Stadium and participate in the Thai sport of hoop takraw. The first team to kick the ball into the hoop would win the Fast Forward award. Adam & Andrea won the Fast Forward.

This leg's Detour was a choice between Bling It or Shred It. In Bling It, teams had to travel to Wat Ratchanatdaram, where they would choose a tuk-tuk to decorate. Once chosen, they had to compare two decorated tuk-tuks to determine which decorations were identical on both, including one of the plush pandas and elephants they were given back at Vancouver and Beijing. They then had to search the nearby Amulet Market and Khlong Thom Center to buy the decorations to affix to their chosen tuk-tuk. Once all details were correct, teams would receive their next clue. In Shred It, teams had to travel to Flow House, where both team members had to maintain their balance while surfing an artificially-generated wave and grab a flag hanging overhead to receive their next clue.

Additional tasks
After receiving their clue and a pair of plush Sinorama-branded elephant toys from Jon, teams had to search in front of the Beijing South railway station for a Sinorama representative that would give them high-speed train tickets to Shanghai.
Upon arrival in Shanghai, teams had to travel to Tock's Montreal Style Deli, where they would repeat the Mandarin phrase they learned at the Great Wall on the previous leg ("xie xie ni") to a Sinorama representative that would give them their next clue.
Upon arrival in Bangkok, teams had to travel to the Caturday Café and search inside for their next clue.
Teams who didn't choose the Fast Forward had to travel by water taxi from Pier 2 at the Yodpiman Riverwalk to the Artist's House at Wat Khuha Sawan Pier. Here, they had to dress in black and, in complete silence, choreograph a traditional Thai puppet show with a hand-carved puppet depicting the mythical figure Hanuman, including specific interactions with audience members, to receive the clue for the Detour.

Leg 6 (Thailand → Ontario → Quebec)

Airdate: August 8, 2017
Bangkok (Siam@Siam Design Hotel Bangkok) (Pit Start)
 Bangkok (Suvarnabhumi Airport) to Ottawa, Ontario, Canada (Ottawa Macdonald–Cartier International Airport)
Ottawa (Ottawa City Hall – Ottawa 2017 Cauldron)
Ottawa (Hog's Back Falls)
 Ottawa (RCMP Stables)
 Ottawa (Commissioners Park or Canada Council Art Bank)
Ottawa (ByWard Market – BeaverTails) 
Gatineau, Quebec (Canadian Museum of History – Canadian History Hall (The Hub)) 
Gatineau (Canadian Museum of History – Upper Terrace overlooking the Ottawa River) 

In this leg's Roadblock, teams travelled to the Royal Canadian Mounted Police National Division facility to find the RCMP Stables, where one team member had to suit up as an RCMP officer and properly groom a show horse from front to back. Next, they had to correctly attach tack and a saddle to the horse. Finally, once approved by the supervising officer, they had to ride the horse into the practice arena and join in the RCMP Musical Ride to receive their next clue.

This leg's Detour was a choice between Tiptoe through the Tulips or Get the Picture. In Tiptoe through the Tulips, teams travelled to Commissioners Park, where they had to assemble a vendor cart for the Canadian Tulip Festival. Once built, they had to search the park for 12 buckets containing tulip bouquets of matching colours and arrange them to match the display on a completed example cart to receive their next clue. In Get the Picture, teams travelled to the Canada Council Art Bank, where they had to use the computer database to find 20 specified artworks by matching serial numbers and, once found, photograph each. Teams then had to place the correct 20 photographs into a photo album binder to receive their next clue.

In this leg's 150 Challenge, teams had to study the exhibits before making their way to the Canadian History Hall, where both teams members had to take the Canadian Citizenship Test and score at least 15 out of 20 on the test to receive their next clue.

Additional tasks
At Ottawa City Hall, teams had to search for the Ottawa 2017 Cauldron to receive their next clue from Mayor Jim Watson.
At Hog's Back Falls, each team had to operate and arrange five red or white next-generation 2018 Chevrolet Equinox "True North Edition" using the surround-vision technology so they spell out one of the six letters in the word C-A-N-A-D-A to receive the clue for the Roadblock.
After the Detour, teams travelled to Byward Market to find the Double U-Turn Board outside of the BeaverTails café.
After passing their Citizenship Test, teams had to make their way to the upper terrace, overlooking Parliament Hill on the Ontario side of the river, to find Jon and the Pit Stop for this leg. At the Pit Stop, their Canadian citizenship would be reaffirmed by taking the Oath of Citizenship in front of Senior Citizenship Judge Renata Brum.

Leg 7 (Ontario → Newfoundland and Labrador)

Airdate: August 15, 2017
Ottawa (Major's Hill Park) (Pit Start)
 Ottawa (Ottawa Macdonald–Cartier International Airport) to Deer Lake, Newfoundland and Labrador (Deer Lake Regional Airport)
Corner Brook (Bank of Montreal Branch)
Woody Point (Gros Morne National Park – Discovery Centre)  
  Corner Brook (Corner Brook Centre Bowl)
 Corner Brook (Swirsky's Theatre and Music Hall)
Corner Brook (Captain James Cook National Historic Site Lookout) 

For their Speed Bump, Andrea & Ebonie had to shoot archers' arrows at a target until they earned a combined total of 25 points before they could continue racing.

This leg's Detour was a choice between Find Your Dory or Family Story, both taking place in the village of Woody Point within Gros Morne National Park. In Find Your Dory, teams had to use four oars (two oars each) to row a dory boat around Bonne Bay to spot a lobster trap along the shore containing their next clue. After retrieving the clue, they rowed back to the starting point. In Family Story, teams made their way to a mock Viking camp and dressed in period costume. They had to listen to impersonators of three Norse Gods – Loki, Odin, and Thor – describe their ancestry and descendants and then correctly fill in a family tree using stones carved with the given names (as well as some misleading names) to receive their next clue.

For the 150 Challenge and this season's first Face Off, teams travelled to Corner Brook Centre Bowl, where they competed against each other in a full 10-frame game of five-pin bowling, a game developed in Canada. At the end of the game, the team who scored higher won their next clue, while the loser had to wait for another opponent. The last team remaining at the Face Off had to turn over an hourglass and wait out a time penalty before moving on.

In this leg's Roadblock, teams travelled to Swirsky's Theatre and Music Hall, where one team member had to choose and memorize twelve jokes from a list of fifty and successfully perform a stand-up comedy act on stage to receive their next clue from comedian Trent McClellan. Some of the jokes were intentionally duds. If they failed, they would be pelted with fruits and vegetables by the audience.

Additional task
At the BMO branch in Corner Brook, teams received a tablet containing a video message from their loved ones informing them of their next destination: the Discovery Centre in Gros Morne National Park.

Additional note
Upon arrival in Deer Lake, teams found a 2017 Chevrolet Spark that served as their transportation on this leg.

Leg 8 (Newfoundland and Labrador → Panama)

Airdate: August 22, 2017
Corner Brook (Corner Brook City Hall) (Pit Start)
 Deer Lake (Deer Lake Regional Airport) to Panama City, Panama (Tocumen International Airport)
Panama City (Biomuseo)
Panama City (Casco Viejo – Paseo Esteban Huertas) 
 Panama City (Hotel Las Clementinas or Boxing Gym) 
Panama City (Sports Complex Escuela Dr. Belisario Porras)
Panama City (Cinta Costera – Parador Fotográfico (Panamá Sign)) 

In this leg's Roadblock, one team member had to choose and memorize an intricate mola pattern at a marked kiosk, then search the streets and plazas of Casco Viejo for the one Kuna woman among many who was wearing the matching pattern on their dress. Once they found the correct woman, they had to escort her back to the kiosk to receive their next clue.

This leg's Detour was a choice between Up for a Drink or Down for the Count. In Up for a Drink, teams travelled to Hotel Las Clementinas, where they would find beers from Casa Bruja Microbrewery. They then had to taste and identify five flavours of craft beer, from a selection of fourteen listed ingredients, to receive their next clue. In Down for the Count, teams travelled to a boxing gym, where both team members had to memorize six combinations of boxing moves, then each get into the ring and perform all six in succession against a professional to receive their next clue.

Additional tasks
At the Biomuseo, designed by world-renowned Canadian architect Frank Gehry, teams had to search the exhibits for the white wolf, where they would find a clue box beneath with their next clue.
At Paseo Esteban Huertas, teams had to search along the seawall for their next clue.
At the Sports Complex Escuela Dr. Belisario Porras, teams had to dress as drum majors and correctly lead the world-renowned college marching band, Banda De Música Virgilio Escala Colegio Pedro Pablo Sánchez, with a choreographed mace routine to receive their next clue.
The clue teams received from the drum major task was a photograph of Jon in front of a "Panamá" sign. Teams had to figure out that this sign was located at Parador Fotográfico on Cinta Costera, the Pit Stop for this leg. However, there were two identical signs along the coast (the other one is located at the Causeway Islands), so they had to make note of the background details in the photograph to determine which location was the correct one.

Leg 9 (Panama → Saskatchewan)

Airdate: August 29, 2017
Panama City (Panama Canal – Miraflores Locks) (Pit Start)
 Panama City (Tocumen International Airport) to Regina, Saskatchewan, Canada (Regina International Airport)
Regina (Douglas Park Elementary School)
R.M. of Redburn (Aulie Farms)   
Rouleau (Dog River Hotel) 
Moose Jaw (Crescent Park)
Caron (Grandpa's Garden) 
Bushell Park (15 Wing Moose Jaw Canadian Armed Forces Base – Hangar 7) 

For their Speed Bump, Karen & Bert had to use pitchforks to clean out manure-covered hay from a horse stall in the stable, then lay down fresh hay in its place before they could continue with the Detour.

This leg's Detour was a choice between The Cart or The Horse. In the 150 Challenge The Cart, teams had to maneuver a self-propelled grain auger to a grain cart, locate the auger's screw conveyor power switch, then shovel  of Canadian-developed canola seed into the auger's mouth and convey it into the grain cart to receive their next clue. In The Horse, teams had to lead an auction for a Clydesdale horse. One team member was the auctioneer, who had to memorize and recite the horse's story to bidders and call out asking prices, and their partner was the bid catcher, who had to relay bids to their partner both verbally and with hand signals. After selling a horse for C$6,000, teams received their next clue.

In this leg's Roadblock, one team member had to dress as a beekeeper, search the honeycombs of a hive of 20,000 honey bees for the one queen bee, and correctly point her out to a judge to receive their next clue.

Additional tasks
At Douglas Park Elementary School, as part of BMO's Grant a Wish campaign, teams had to squeeze a full pitcher of orange juice from oranges and serve the juice to a lunchroom of children to receive their next clue from wish recipient Leanne, whose wish was for every child to receive a healthy breakfast.
At the Dog River Hotel in Rouleau, one of the filming locations from the CTV sitcom Corner Gas, which was filmed in and around the community, teams would find the Double U-Turn board.
At Moose Jaw's Crescent Park, teams had to correctly arrange, with graphics forward and cans right-side up, 250 cans of sponsor Campbell Soup Company's Chunky soup on a provided base into a maple leaf shape following an example photograph to receive their next clue from Christopher, the Amazing Race Canada Superfan Contest winner.

Additional note
Upon arrival in Regina, teams found 2017 Chevrolet Cruzes in the airport parking lot that would serve as their transportation for this leg, with a choice between either a sedan or a hatchback model.

Leg 10 (Saskatchewan → Ontario)

Airdate: September 5, 2017
Regina (Victoria Park) (Pit Start)
 Regina (Regina International Airport) to Sault Ste. Marie, Ontario (Sault Ste. Marie Airport)
 Sault Ste. Marie (Agawa Canyon Railway)
 Sault Ste. Marie (Mockin'bird Hill Pioneer Farm or Kinsmen Park)
 Sault Ste. Marie (John Rhodes Community Centre)
 Sault Ste. Marie (Mill Market – Entomica Insectarium)
Sault Ste. Marie (Bellevue Park – Topsail Island) 

In this leg's 150 Challenge, teams travelled to a designated rail crossing and boarded the Agawa Canyon Tour train to ride it through the Algoma Highlands and Agawa Canyon. In one coach car, they found the titles and critiques of 14 works by the Canadian artists known as the Group of Seven, and prints of the corresponding works in the next coach car. They then had to memorize and, in the front baggage car, correctly identify all 14 to receive the clue for the Detour from the conductor. However, teams had to complete the task within the 30 minute travel time, otherwise they had to remain on the train and wait for the round trip to complete before they can try again.

This season's final Detour was a choice between Alpac-It or I'll Cast It. In Alpac-It, teams travelled to the Mockin'bird Hill Pioneer Farm, where they had to lead two alpacas through an obstacle course of nine obstacles, without knocking any down, in a time of three minutes or less to receive their next clue. In I'll Cast It, teams travelled to Kinsmen Park, donned hip waders, and entered Kinsmen Lake, where each team member had to cast their fly fishing rod to hit three floating targets to receive their next clue.

For this season's final Face Off, teams travelled to the John Rhodes Community Centre Pool. On a circular curling sheet, teams competed against each other in Crokicurl – a recently developed game that is a cross between curling and the Canadian-created board game crokinole. The team who arrived earlier had the choice of taking their turn first or second. Each ring has a specific point value. Across from their partner, each team member took turns throwing six curling stones, attempting to knock out their opponent's stones while keeping theirs in place to score the most points. If the opposing stone is in play, it must be hit. If a stone lands in the direct centre, or "button", it is worth 20 points and the stone is removed from play. After all stones are thrown, the team with the higher score received the clue for the Roadblock. The last team remaining at the Face Off had to turn over an hourglass and wait out a time penalty before moving on.

In this leg's Roadblock, teams travelled to Entomica Insectarium in Mill Market. The team member not performing the Roadblock had to insert their head into a plexiglass box, after which four species of live giant cockroaches were dropped on them. The team member who was performing the Roadblock then had to count the correct number of each species to receive their next clue.

Additional note
At the Sault Ste. Marie airport parking lot, teams found their next clue inside 2017 Chevrolet Colorado ZR-2s that would serve as their transportation for this leg.

Leg 11 (Ontario → Quebec)

Airdate: September 12, 2017
Sault Ste. Marie (Sault Ste. Marie Boardwalk) (Pit Start)
 Sault Ste. Marie (Sault Ste. Marie Airport) to Quebec City, Quebec (Québec City Jean Lesage International Airport)
Quebec City (Québec City Jean Lesage International Airport – Airport Traffic Control Tower)
 Quebec City (Montmorency Falls)
Quebec City (Saint-Roch – Place de Bordeaux)
Quebec City (Carnaval de Québec Warehouse)
Quebec City (Le Musée du Chocolat Érico)
 Quebec City (Édifice Marie-Guyart – Observatoire de la Capitale)
Quebec City (Morrin Centre)
Sainte-Famille, Île d'Orléans (Parc des Ancêtres) 

In this leg's first Roadblock, one team member had to attach a harness and a climb down a cargo net suspended from the pedestrian bridge over the  waterfall to retrieve their next clue, then climb back up to reunite with their partner.

In this season's final Roadblock, the team member who did not perform the previous Roadblock had to pull themselves up the side of the 31-storey Édifice Marie-Guyart, Quebec City's tallest building, to the rooftop. Once there, they had to search the city to spot a yellow and red Amazing Race flag on the roof of their next destination, the Morrin Centre, then take the elevator back down to reunite with their partner.

Additional tasks
Upon arrival in Quebec City, teams had to search outside the airport for their next clue, which was near the control tower.
At Place de Bordeaux plaza in the Saint-Roch neighbourhood of Old Quebec, teams had to choose a bike rickshaw with one team member becoming driver and the other the dispatcher. Using only a location list, map with street names and places written in French, and walkie-talkies, the dispatcher had to give the driver directions through the streets of Old Quebec to pick up three passengers carrying a card colour-coded to each team, and transport them to their proper destination, after which each would give the card to the driver. After returning to Place de Bordeaux with all three cards, teams received their next clue.
At the storage warehouse of the Quebec Winter Carnival to search among the many figures of Bonhomme, the famous snowman mascot of the festival, to find their next clue, which was a box of chocolates wrapped in yellow and red ribbon, from Érico Chocolatier, their next destination. Written on the bottom of the box was "trade in for the next clue". Once there, teams exchanged the box for a giant chocolate egg that they had to break open to find the second Roadblock clue.
At the Morrin Centre, teams would find a bag containing over 150 puzzle pieces forming a large map of Canada, and 10 cards referencing challenges throughout the season, 6 of which were the 150 Challenges. Once the puzzle was fully assembled in a tabletop frame, teams then had to place only the 6 correct 150 Challenge cards over the city in which the challenges took place to receive their final clue.

{| class="wikitable"
|-
!Leg
!Location
!Task
|-
!1
|Vancouver, BC
|Tight Rope
|-
!2
|Fort McMurray, AB
|Pump It
|-
!6
|Gatineau, QC
|Citizenship Test
|-
!7
|Corner Brook, NL
|5 Pin Bowling
|-
!9
|Regina, SK
|Canola
|-
!10
|Sault Ste Marie, ON
|Group of Seven
|}

Episode title quotes
Episode titles are often taken from quotes made by the racers.
"Who Wants to Be the Python?" – Kenneth
"You've Got to Leave My Hose Alone Dude!" – Ryan
"It's Like Ducks In the Forest" – Korey
"This Is a Butt Workout" – Ebonie
"This Is a Real Cat and Mouse Chase" – Shabbir
"We Just Saw Johnny Mustard" – Kenneth
"Break Time For Korey" – Ivana
"Can I See Your Kuna?" – Korey
"It's Like Finding Waldo In a Bunch of Waldos" – Andrea (of Adam & Andrea)
"They're Crawling On YOU!" – Ivana
"Canada's Coming Together Like a Piece of Cake" – Kenneth

Ratings
Viewership includes initial date of viewing plus seven day DVR playback.

References

External links

 05
2017 Canadian television seasons
Television shows filmed in Newfoundland and Labrador
Television shows filmed in British Columbia
Television shows filmed in Alberta
Television shows filmed in China
Television shows filmed in Thailand
Television shows filmed in Ontario
Television shows filmed in Panama
Television shows filmed in Saskatchewan
Television shows filmed in Quebec